This is a list of recordings of the Messa da Requiem by Giuseppe Verdi (1813–1901).

List

References
Notes

Sources:
 Jolly, James, editor (2007). The Gramophone Classical Music Guide 2008. Middlesex, UK: Haymarket Consumer Media. .
 March, Ivan, editor (1996). The Penguin Guide to Compact Discs and Cassettes (new edition with Edward Greenfield and Robert Layton). London: Penguin Books.
 March, Ivan; Livesey, Alan, editors (2007). The Penguin Guide to Recorded Classical Music (completely revised 2008 edition with Edward Greenfield, Robert Layton, and Paul Czajkowski). London: Penguin Books. .

External links

Amazon discography (14 items), accessed 11 November 2010

Discographies of classical compositions
Requiem